The 1968 Borrego Mountain earthquake occurred on April 8, at 18:28 PST, near the unincorporated community of Ocotillo Wells in San Diego County. Damage was relatively moderate, and the mainshock was assigned a maximum Modified Mercalli intensity (MMI) of VII (Very strong). Shaking was felt in Nevada, and Arizona. It was the largest earthquake to strike California since 1952, and its display of afterslip became the subject of scientific interest.

Tectonic setting 
300x300pxA simplified tectonic bounday map of the Salton Trough area. Red lines show major faults and arrows indicate fault motion.

The San Andreas Fault (SAF) is the main plate boundary that defines the margin between the Pacific and North American Plates in California. It is believed to have formed during the Oligocene. Divided into four distinct segments, it displays right-lateral strike-slip movement. It accommodates 20–75 percent of plate motion between the Pacific and North American plates its segments. The tectonic boundary in Southern California is complex—plate motion is accommodated by the SAF and a network of subparallel faults. The SAF terminates at the Salton Trough, a transtensional zone (pull-apart basin) that separates it from the Imperial Fault in the south. The exact measurement of slip across faults in this zone is poorly understood.

California Borderland
West of the Salton Trough is a largely offshore fault system that accommodates approximately 20 percent of the plate motion. Faults such as the Rose Canyon Fault and the Newport-Inglewood Fault pose large risks to unprepared coastal communities such as San Diego and Los Angeles.

San Jacinto Fault Zone
East of the California Borderland, the plate boundary is a complex zone of faults that run parallel to the SAF. The two main faults are the San Jacinto Fault Zone (SJFZ) and Elsinore Fault Zone. The SJFZ is a complex, highly segmented, and overlapped fault zone that runs parallel to the San Andreas Fault, but separated by the San Jacinto Mountains. It is located on the eastern Salton Trough, and runs  directly beneath the cities of San Bernardino, Colton, San Jacinto and Hemet. Segments of the SJFZ are given names despite being one fault system. These segments include the Coyote Creek (CCF), Superstition Hills (SHF), and Superstition Mountain (SMF) faults. The CCF is estimated to be -long and displays right-lateral strike-slip displacement. Considered the most active fault in Southern California, 36 notable earthquakes have been associated with it since 1857. Between 1915 and 1954, five earthquakes of magnitude 6.0 or greater were damaging. Seismic activity on the SJFZ is greater than on the SAF.

Eastern California Shear Zone
Further east, near the border with Nevada and Arizona, the Eastern California Shear Zone (ECSZ) takes up to 25 percent of the plate motion. The ECSZ consists of north–west trending right-lateral faults in the Mojave Desert, and Walker Lane, which lies at the western margin of the Basin and Range Province. Large earthquakes associated with the ECSZ occurred in 1872, 1992, 1999 and 2019.

Earthquake 

The only recorded foreshock had a magnitude of 3.7, occurring one minute before the mainshock. There was no foreshock activity recorded in the hours to weeks before the mainshock; seismic activity in the area was lower than usual in the four months before April 1968. The mainshock which measured 6.6 , was the result of shallow strike-slip faulting which initiated from the hypocenter at  depth. It ruptured bilaterally along the CCF and displayed an almost pure right-lateral focal mechanism. A focal mechanism analysis indicated the rupture plane had a northwest strike and dipped steeply (80°) to the south.

Surface rupture
A -long surface rupture through Quaternary alluvium and lake bed sediments was revealed. At its northern extreme, the rupture sliced through the Palm Spring Formation. The rupture zone consisted of two northwest-oriented segments, separated by a -wide discontinuity.

Unusually, there were left-lateral displacements  from Ocotillo Badlands north of Highway 78 and at the northern base of Borrego Mountain. Whether these left-lateral offsets were part of the rupture mechanism or environmental changes unrelated to tectonic processes could not be determined.

Aftershocks
A one-year-long aftershock sequence followed; at least 135 aftershocks measuring 3.0 or greater was recorded. In the zone of aftershocks, the mainshock epicenter was located in the middle. The concentration of aftershocks was greater in the southeast of the mainshock than to the northwest. These aftershocks were predominantly right-lateral strike-slip events. Several recorded aftershocks had some sense of dip-slip faulting. There were aftershocks being reported close to the SMF and SHF at the southeastern extremity of the rupture. A magnitude 5.2 aftershock occurred at 19:03. Forty-five minutes later, a magnitude 4.7 aftershock caused minor damage in Calexico. Nearly a year later, a 5.8 aftershock was recorded. This shock had its own sequence of aftershocks.

Intensity 

The maximum peak ground acceleration (pga) recorded by a seismometer at El Centro was 0.14 g. A maximum MMI of VII (Very strong) was assigned in the Borrego Mountain–Ocotillo Wells area (northeastern San Diego County) where surface rupturing occurred. Based on the study of ground effects alone, however, the MMI could be as high as IX (Violent). In this zone, small offsets occurred along the Coyote Creek Fault and Highway 78 near Ocotillo Wells cracked. At Anza-Borrego Desert State Park, large boulders toppled. At Split Mountain, falling rocks damaged many vehicles belonging to campers. Large boulders also blocked the Montezuma-Borrego Highway. Rockfalls, slumps and liquefaction took place as a result of the strong ground motion.

Heavier damage included cracked and fragmented concrete bridge piers. There was minor damage in Ocotillo Wells but a house had its walls split apart and bedroom detached from the main structure. A storage tank beside the house spilled 3,600 gallons of water over the porch, toppling its posts. Ground cracks appeared at the airport and roads. Residents were temporarily without water due to a damaged community well pump. Large transformers  from Ocotillo Wells were displaced, snapping anchor bolts and X-bracings.

A long rolling motion of up to thirty seconds was described. Swimming pools sloshed about for ten minutes. Plasters fell from the walls and ceilings on the second level of the Balboa Hotel in El Centro. In Calexico, the ceiling of a Safeway supermarket partially collapsed. The upper brick wall of a laundromat in Westmorland collapsed, while another building was cracked.

MMI VI (Strong) shaking frightened many residents. Damage was minimal due to the area's sparse urban planning. Shifting furnitures; falling objects; rocking vehicles, trees and bushes; and minor cracks were reported. Minor rockslides occurred, including some at Barrett Dam. At Borrego Springs, minor cracks appeared in the facade of a church. Cracks also appeared in the ground and on windows. Furniture moved several inches while swimming pools sloshed. Goods and items fell off shelves in stores, forcing some to shut down. In Mecca, several concrete pipelines ruptured and a truck nearly overturned. In Anza concrete floorings cracked and plasters fell from buildings. In a public library at Imperial, 7,500 books fell from shelves. Cracked concrete pavements and driveways occurred in Yuma and Horn, Arizona.

At San Diego, a small crack appeared in a  concrete retaining wall. Broken windows, severed powerlines, and sloshing of swimming pools were widely reported. Cracks appeared along Sunset Cliffs Boulevard and plasters detached from building. At Mexicali, Baja California, windows broke and lights went out at a sheriff office. Landslides occurred at Sage. Grocery stores in Riverside suffered significant losses from fallen bottled products.

The , which was docked at Long Beach rocked for five minutes. In Los Angeles, two structures built before revised earthquake codes sustained minor damage such as the widening or reopening of plaster cracks formed by the 1933 and 1952 earthquakes. Plasters fell off buildings in the city.

Post-earthquake slips 
After the earthquake, the fault displayed a phenomenon known as aseismic creep, observed only along the central and southernmost section of the rupture. It was discovered on June 9 by the manager of a motel at Ocotillo Wells.

While the central section of the CCF rupture experienced aseismic creep, there was no movement along the southernmost rupture until from January 1969 to December 1970. There was no feasible way of measuring these new offsets as tire tracks, used for measuring, had disappeared. It is estimated that the post-earthquake slip produced  of additional displacement, in addition to the  during the earthquake. These new surface ruptures measured .

Triggered slips 
A remarkable feature was slip along faults located far from the epicenter area. The SAF, Imperial, and Superstition Hills faults displayed this phenomenon. Field observations revealed  of right-lateral displacement occurred along these faults. Triggered slips were not observed on other prominent faults such as segments of the SJFZ north of the CCF, the SMF that lies parallel to the SHF, and the Elsinore Fault Zone. Geologists postulated the slip was shaking-induced, ruling out stress transfer as a cause. Slip continued until 1972.

Evidence of movement along the Imperial Fault ( from epicenter) was discovered on April 13 on Interstate 8 when cracks appeared. However, the cracks were not well determined as there were already cracks to the road from an earthquake in March 1966 (the magnitude 3.6 earthquake is the smallest earthquake associated with a surface rupture). The Imperial Fault was the first to be discovered creeping which prompted checks on other faults. It produced an estimated  of right-lateral slip.

Along the SHF,  of displacement was measured at Imler Road ( from epicenter). A  section of the SHF moved. The SHF also produced creep after the 1987 earthquakes. Movement along the Southern California segment of the SAF ( northeast of the epicenter) was documented on April 24. The last major earthquake on this section of the SAF occurred in 1680, with an estimated magnitude of 7.8.

See also
 List of earthquakes in 1968
 List of earthquakes in California
 List of earthquakes in the United States

References 

Sources

External links
 

1968 earthquakes
Earthquakes in California
1968 natural disasters in the United States
Geology of San Diego County, California
Imperial Valley
Natural history of Baja California
1968 in California
Strike-slip earthquakes
Anza-Borrego Desert State Park
History of Imperial County, California